Nelson Lake is located south of Minnehaha, New York. The outlet creek flows into Middle Branch Moose River. Fish species present in the lake are white sucker, black bullhead, smallmouth bass, largemouth bass, yellow perch, and sunfish. Access via trail off unimproved road from Route 28 on the east shore and via the Middle Branch Moose River.

References

Lakes of Herkimer County, New York